Amos or AMOS may refer to:

Arts and entertainment 

 Amos (album), an album by Michael Ray
 Amos (band), an American Christian rock band
 Amos (film), a 1985 American made-for-television drama film
 Amos (guitar) a 1958 Gibson Flying V
 Amos Records, an independent record label established in Los Angeles, California, in 1968

People and religious figures 
 Amos (name), a given name, nickname and surname
 Amos, a Jewish prophet from the 8th century BCE, the author of the Book of Amos.

Technology
 AMOS or Advanced Mortar System, a 120 mm automatic twin barreled, breech loaded mortar turret
 AMOS (programming language), a dialect of BASIC on the Amiga computer
 Alpha Micro Operating System, a proprietary operating system used in Alpha Microsystems minicomputers
 AMOS (statistical software package), a statistical software package used in structural equation modeling
 Air Force Maui Optical and Supercomputing observatory, an Air Force Research Laboratory operating on Maui, Hawaii
 Amos (satellite), series of Israeli IAI-built civilian communications satellites
 AMOS (satellite bus), a satellite bus that is the foundation of all but one of the Amos satellites

Places

United States 
 Amos, Kentucky, an unincorporated community
 Amos, Missouri, an unincorporated community
 Amos, Nevada, an unincorporated community
 Amos Lake (Minnesota)
 Amos Lake (Connecticut), New London County, Connecticut

Elsewhere 
 Amos, Quebec, Canada, a town
 Amos (ancient city), an ancient town close to Marmaris, Turkey
 Amos Lake (Antarctica), a lake on Signy Island

Other uses
 Book of Amos, a book in the Bible
 Amos, the NATO reporting name of the R-33 air-to-air missile
 Australian Meteorological and Oceanographic Society
 Ancient Mystic Order of Samaritans, a fraternal appendant body to the Odd Fellows

See also
 Famous Amos, a cookie company founded by Wally Amos